Tarun Majumdar (or Mazumdar, 8 January 1931 – 4 July 2022) was an Indian film director, Documentary filmmaker, Author, Illustrator
and Screenwriter who is known for his work in Bengali cinema. He received four National Awards, seven BFJA Awards, five Filmfare Awards and an Anandalok Award. In 1990, the Government of India honoured him with the Padma Shri, the fourth highest civilian award.

He alongside Sachin Mukherji and Dilip Mukherji made his directorial debut, under the screen name Yatrik, with the 1959 Bengali film Chaowa Pawa starring Suchitra Sen and Uttam Kumar as the leads.

He received his first National Award for the 1962 Bengali film Kancher Swarga. He also garnered wide critical acclamation for his directorial ventures such as Palatak (1963), Nimantran (1971), Sansar Simante (1975) and Ganadevata (1978). He received a National Award, a BFJA Award and a Filmfare Award for Nimantran (1971). Ganadevata (1979) won him a National Award and a Filmfare Award.

He made blockbusters such as Balika Badhu (1967), Kuheli (1971), Shriman Prithviraj (1973), Fuleswari (1974), Dadar Kirti (1980), Bhalobasa Bhalobasa (1985) and Apan Amar Apan (1990).

His ex-wife Sandhya Roy starred in twenty of his films and Tapas Paul in eight. Moushumi Chatterjee, Mahua Roychoudhury, Ayan Banerjee and Tapas Paul were introduced by him to the silver screen. Director/writer Sooraj Barjatya's father Rajkumar Barjatya and Rajkumar Barjatya's Friend was Legendary filmmaker Tarun Majumdar suggested the script of Maine Pyar Kiya.

Early years 
Majumdar was born on 8 January 1931 in Bogra which was then part of Bengal Presidency of British India. His father Birendranath Majumdar was a freedom fighter from Munsirhat. He studied intermediate from St. Paul's Cathedral Mission College  and did his Graduation at Scottish Church College both affiliated to the University of Calcutta. He married fellow Bengali actress Sandhya Roy but later they started living separately but never divorced.In May 2011,  Majumdar  resigned from the post of the advisor of Nandan (West Bengal film centre in Kolkata).

Career 
Majumdar start his career as a Poster Illustrator to Film Technician. 
His early films were credited to Yatrik (phonetically Jatrik in Bengali). Yatrik was the screenname of the trio of directors Tarun Majumdar, Sachin Mukherji, and Dilip Mukherji until 1963 after which each began to be credited separately. As Yatrik, their first venture was Chaowa Paowa (1959) starring Uttam Kumar and Suchitra Sen. Yatrik made Kancher Swarga (1962) featuring Dilip Mukherjee in the lead.

In 1965, Majumdar made two films — Ektuku Basa with Soumitra Chatterjee and Alor Pipasa with Basanta Choudhury. Both the films featured Sandhya Roy as the female protagonist. In 1967, he made one of the top-grossing films of the year, Balika Badhu, an adaptation of a Bengali story written by Bimal Kar, in which a teenage Moushumi Chatterjee made her debut. He would remake it in Hindi in 1976, where it was a moderate success. His Shriman Prithviraj became a major box office success.

In 1974, Majumdar directed Fuleswari, starring Sandhya Roy as the titular character. Some of the biggest names in the Bengali music industry of the time (viz. Hemanta Mukherjee, Manna Dey, Sandhya Mukherjee, Aarti Mukherjee and Anup Ghoshal) provided vocals for the film's songs. Years later, Majumdar had acknowledged Fuleswari as his favorite film. In 1975, he directed Sansar Simante, based on a screenplay by Rajen Tarafdar, which was itself adapted from a short story by Premendra Mitra. Soumitra Chatterjee portrayed Aghor, a thief. Years later, Chatterjee had admitted Aghor as one of his best roles. In 1979, Majumdar's film Ganadevata became the first Bengali film to win National Film Award for Best Popular Film Providing Wholesome Entertainment.

He cast Mahua Roychoudhury as the female lead in Dadar Kirti (1980) based on a short story by Sharadindu Bandyopadhyay. He proposed Debashree Roy to play the role of Bini. Roy who was struggling with her career at that time, used to be credited as Rumki Roy in her films. Majumdar did not like the name Rumki. He suggested before Rumki's mother Arati Roy that her name should be altered into Debashree and her mother agreed. Ayan Banerjee was cast in the role Santu, the chirpy lover of Bini. The film marked the debut of Tapas Paul who starred as the protagonist Kedar who falls in love with Saraswati portrayed by Mahua Roychoudhury. The film became a major box office success catapulting Paul to stardom. The film won Roychoudhury Filmfare Awards East in 1981.

Majumdar cast Sandhya Roy in four consecutive films — Shahar Theke Dure (1981), Meghmukti (1982), Khelar Putul (1982) and Amar Geeti (1984). The last two films became major debacle at the box office generating the speculation in media that Sandhya Roy was no longer capable to draw mass appeal. He roped Tapas Paul and Debashree Roy in the romantic drama Bhalobasa Bhalobasa. The film gained major box office success. Majumdar cast Paul in another two films, Agaman (1988) and Parashmoni (1988).

Majumdar again cast Paul alongside Prosenjit Chatterjee and Satabdi Roy in Apan Amar Apan (1990). The film was a roaring success at the box office.

In 2003, he made a comeback with Alo, a film based on a story written by Bibhutibhushan Bandopadhyay. Rituparna Sengupta played the titular role. It received critical and popular acclaim and became one of the hits of the year. As in many of Majumdar's films, the soundtrack featured songs written and composed by Rabindranath Tagore. 
 
In 2006, he directed Bhalobasar Onek Naam, casting Uttam Kumar's grandson Gourab Chatterjee and Hemanta Mukherjee's granddaughter, and Moushumi Chatterjee's daughter Megha as lead actors. It was not well received by critics or audiences.
 
In 2007, he made another feature film, Chander Bari, based on a joint family saga which got critical acclaim from viewers and was a hit. Rituparna Sengupta again was the main lead. Playback singer Babul Supriyo made his debut in this film opposite Rituparna. The songs featured were again composed by Rabindranath Tagore.

His last full-length feature film, Bhalobashar Bari released in 2018. Rituparna Sengupta again played the protagonist in the film.

Cinematic sensibility 
His movies were popular for their enduring characters and evergreen music. His affinity was on literature and Rabindra Sangeet. Tarun Majumdar explains, "I make films based on literature. I differ with directors who in the name of experimentation make non-narrative cinema. To me a film must draw the audience, as the medium for masses. I believe if the film is not commercially successful, it's not 'good', as the audience always go for good movies."
Majumdar depicted rural life with warmth and celebrated their way of living. “Majumdar told stories set in rural India with compassion and sophistication which appealed to audiences across sections" said the maker of Feluda: 50 Years of Ray’s Detective. 
His movie style and pattern look like a Victtorio De Sica's work.

Recognition

West Bengal Chief Minister Mamata Banerjee has expressed grief over the death of Tarun Majumdar. Nimantran has been restored and digitized by the National Film Archive of India. Tarun Majumdar was the recipient of the prestigious Padma Shri Award in 1990.He got the Lifetime Achievement honor, at the West Bengal Film Journalist Association Awards in 2017.

Death
Majumdar died from a heart attack at a hospital in Kolkata on 4 July 2022 at the age of 91. He suffered from chest infection, kidney and heart ailments prior to his death.
Tarun Majumder donated his body for promotion of Medical Education to the Anatomy Department of SSKM Hospital, Kolkata.

Literary works
He wrote the first book Cinemaparha Diye Part -1 & 2.

Nakshi Kantha

Awards

Filmography

References

External links 
 
 Tarun Majumdar at BookMyShow

1931 births
2022 deaths
Bengali Hindus
Bengali film directors
Film directors from Kolkata
Recipients of the Padma Shri in arts
Scottish Church College alumni
University of Calcutta alumni
Kalakar Awards winners
People from Bogra District
20th-century Indian film directors
Directors who won the Best Popular Film Providing Wholesome Entertainment National Film Award